Puntius nangalensis is a species of cyprinid fish endemic to India. It inhabits littoral areas of lakes.

References 

Puntius
Freshwater fish of India
Endemic fauna of India
Fish described in 1990